Dark Chambers of Déjà Vu  is the second studio album by Czech melodic power metal band Sebastien, released in 2015 under German record label Pride & Joy Music.

The album includes the collaboration of several renowned guest musicians, as Ailyn Gimenez (Sirenia), Martin "Marthus" Skaroupka (Cradle of Filth), Roland Grapow (Masterplan), Tony Martin (ex-Black Sabbath) and Zak Stevens (ex-Savatage), among others.

A special version of the album includes two bonus tracks, “Dorian” (song from their previous album) and "Headless Cross", (Black Sabbath cover) which are the live performances at Masters of Rock festival, recorded on 12 July 2014.

Track listing
All songs written & arranged by George Rain, Andy Mons, Petri Kallio & Pavel "Dvorkys“ Dvorak. 
All lyrics written by Jan Petričko, except “Lamb Of God” by Tony Martin & Jan Petričko.

 "Stranger at the Door" - 4:14	 
 "Highland Romance" - 4:17	 
 "Crucifixion of the Heart" - 3:17	 
 "Lamb of God" - 3:56	 
 "The Wall of Lyman-Alpha" - 3:10	 
 "Sphinx in Acheron" - 4:11	 
 "Frozen Nightingales" - 4:32	 
 "Sleep in the Glass" - 4:06	 
 "The Ocean" - 4:30	 
 "Man in the Maze" - 3:44	 
 "The House of Medusa" - 3:25	 
  "My Deepest Winter" - 4:31	 
 "Last Dance at Rosslyn Chapel" - 3:56

Bonus tracks 
 "Dorian" (Live) - 5:41	 
 "Headless Cross" (Live) (Black Sabbath cover) - 7:32

Personnel

Band members
George Rain - Vocals
Andy Mons - Guitars
Petri Kallio - Bass
Pavel "Dvorkys" Dvorak	- Keyboards

Guest musicians
Ailyn Gimenez - Vocals (female) (track 13)
Marlin Rya Poemy - Vocals (female) (track 6)
Martin "Marthus" Skaroupka - Drums
Roland Grapow - Vocals (track 12), Vocals (backing)
Sergey "Filth" Baidikov - Vocals (tracks 1, 10)
Tony Martin - Vocals (track 4)
Zak Stevens - Vocals (track 9)

Production
Roland Grapow - Producer, Recording, Mixing, Mastering
Jan Petricko - Lyrics
 Tony Martin - Lyrics (track 4)
 Hans Trasid (Dis-Art Design) - Artwork, Design
 Martin Hruby - Photography
Recorded, mixed and mastered at Grapow Studios in Zvolenská Slatina,  Slovakia.
Acoustic guitars and keyboards recorded at Skala Music Studios in Czech Republic.

References

External links 
Metallum Archives

2015 albums
Sebastien (band) albums